Autonomous republics of Russia may refer to:

 the modern Republics of Russia
 the former Autonomous republics of the RSFSR
 in a larger sense, the former Autonomous Soviet Socialist Republics of the Soviet Union

See also
 Autonomous republic 
 Autonomous administrative division
 Republic (disambiguation)